Thermococcus profundus is a hyperthermophilic archaeon isolated from a deep-sea hydrothermal vent. It is coccoid-shaped with 1–2 μm in diameter, designated as strain DT5432.

One amylase isolated from T. profundus strain DT5432 was found to function at an optimal temperature of 80 °C. The scientists who extracted it speculate that it may have applications in the starch industry because of its heat tolerance and lack of any need for metal ions.

References

Further reading

External links

LPSN
Type strain of Thermococcus profundus at BacDive -  the Bacterial Diversity Metadatabase

Euryarchaeota
Archaea described in 1995